Colymbothetidae is an extinct family of beetles in the suborder Adephaga. Colymbothethis is known from larvae from the Upper Triassic of Kazakhstan. They probably belong to the Dytiscoidea.

References

Prehistoric insect families
†
Adephaga

ru:Parahygrobiidae